Dichomeris conclusa is a moth in the family Gelechiidae. It was described by Edward Meyrick in 1918. It is found in South Africa.

The forewings are deep yellow ochreous, slightly ferruginous tinged, and with a slight violet gloss. The costal edge is blackish towards the base and the plical and first discal stigmata are small, blackish, the plical slightly posterior. There is a narrow blackish terminal fascia from the apex to the tornus, pointed beneath, with black dots on the terminal edge. The hindwings are rather dark grey.

References

Endemic moths of South Africa
Moths described in 1918
conclusa